Linus Weissbach (born April 19, 1998) is a Swedish professional ice hockey left wing currently playing with the Rochester Americans in the American Hockey League (AHL) while under contract as a prospect to the Buffalo Sabres of the National Hockey League (NHL). He played collegiately for University of Wisconsin.

Playing career

Junior
Weissbach played for the Tri-City Storm of the USHL.

College
Weissbach played for the University of Wisconsin. In his senior season, he was named to the Big Ten Conference's Second Team.

Professional
Weissbach was drafted in the seventh round, 192nd overall by the Buffalo Sabres in the 2017 NHL Entry Draft.

Following the completion of his four-year collegiate career, the Sabres signed Weissbach to a two-year entry-level contract on April 6, 2021.

Career statistics

Regular season and playoffs

International

Awards and honors

References

External links
 

1998 births
Living people
Buffalo Sabres draft picks
Frölunda HC players
Rochester Americans players
Ice hockey people from Gothenburg
Swedish ice hockey left wingers
Tri-City Storm players
Wisconsin Badgers men's ice hockey players
AHCA Division I men's ice hockey All-Americans